Jorge Marcelo Faurie (born 24 December 1951) is an Argentine diplomat, and Minister of Foreigns Affairs and Worship of Argentina, serving in President Mauricio Macri's cabinet from 12 June 2017 to 10 December 2019.

He was born in Santa Fe, Santa Fe province. He graduated from National University of the Littoral at Law. He joined the foreign service in 1964. He was Argentine Ambassador to France from 2015, up to the moment of his designation as minister in 2017. He also served as an Ambassador in Portugal between 2002 and 2013.

Minister of Foreign Relations

During the Macri government, he strengthened diplomatic ties with Brazil and the Southern Cone, looked away from the Bolivarian axis and demanded the freedom of political prisoners in Venezuela.

He also promoted the repeal of the agreement with Iran and worked for an rapprochement with the United States, Israel and Europe.

He sought closer ties with the Pacific Alliance.

The most important achievement of its management is the historic European Union–Mercosur free trade agreement.

References 

Argentine people of French descent
Foreign ministers of Argentina
1951 births
Living people
Academic staff of the National University of the Littoral
Ambassadors of Argentina to France
People from Santa Fe, Argentina
Ambassadors of Argentina to Portugal